Under Nineteen is a South Korean reality television show.

Contestants 

The spelling of names in English is according to the official website. The Korean contestants are presented in Eastern order (family name, given name). The age listed is according to the Korean age system at the start of the competition.

Color key

Vocal Team

Rap Team

Performance Team

Overall 

Color key

Trivia 
 Performance team member Kim Shi-hyun is a former Produce 101 Season 2 contestant & former member of South Korean music duo Longguo & Shihyun.
 Rap team member Chang Min-su & Performance team member Eddie are former contestant of Soompi's Rising Legend. Eddie is also a member of a dance cover group called The First Bite.
 Vocal Team's Kim Jung-woo & Performance team's Kosuke are members of a pre-debut boyband HNB from Happy Face Entertainment.
 Performance team's Wumuti is a member of SWIN-S.
 Performance team's Lee Seunghwan, Song Byunghee & Jeon Doyum and Vocal Team's Jung Jinsung and Lim Hyungbin are members of Starhill Boys.
 Rap Team's member Bang Junhyuk and Vocal Team's member Shin Yechan are trainees of Top Media Entertainment. Bang Junhyuk debuted in 2020 with the group MCND.
 Rap Team's member Lee Yechan and Vocal Team's member Kim Youngseok are trainees of KQ Entertainment.
 Rap Team's member Nam Do-hyun participated in Produce X 101 and ended up at 8th place, therefore becoming a member of the project boy group X1.X1 disbanded on January 6, 2020. Nam Do-Hyun then become a member of BAE173.

References 

 
Under Nineteen contestants